Trigueros is a town and municipality located in the province of Huelva, Spain. According to the 2008 census, the municipality had a population of 7,477.

Main Sights
 Dolmen de Soto, dated 3000-2500 BC. It is one of the most famous megalithic monument in Andalusia

References

Municipalities in the Province of Huelva